Joynal Abedin Sarker (died 13 December 2017) was a Jatiya Party (Ershad) politician and the former Member of Parliament of Lalmonirhat-1.

Career
Sarker was elected to parliament from Lalmonirhat-1 as a Jatiya Party candidate in 1986, 1988 and June 1996.

References

Jatiya Party politicians
2017 deaths
3rd Jatiya Sangsad members
4th Jatiya Sangsad members
5th Jatiya Sangsad members
7th Jatiya Sangsad members